George I. Davida is an American computer scientist and cryptographer. He is an outspoken proponent of public access to cryptography and an opponent of various National Security Agency (NSA) and US federal government policies and initiatives like the Clipper chip, a stance dating back to his 1977 reception of a gag order from the NSA under the Invention Secrecy Act relating to a patent application for a stream cipher device, using research funded by a National Science Foundation grant. He used to work at the Department of Electrical Engineering and Computer Science at the University of Iowa. He was director of the University of Wisconsin–Milwaukee's Center for Cryptography, Computer and Network Security, until retiring in 2010.

References

External links 

American cryptographers
University of Wisconsin–Milwaukee faculty
Living people
Year of birth missing (living people)